Shaikh Riazuddin (born 11 May 1971) is an Indian former cricketer. He played six first-class matches for Hyderabad between 1994 and 2000.

See also
 List of Hyderabad cricketers

References

External links
 

1971 births
Living people
Indian cricketers
Hyderabad cricketers
Cricketers from Andhra Pradesh